San Luis Creek, originally Arroyo de San Luis Gonzaga, is a stream in Merced County, California. Its source is located near the eastern crest of the Diablo Range, west of San Luis Reservoir. It is dammed to form San Luis Reservoir in San Luis Reservoir State Park, and below that, O'Neill Forebay. Los Banos Creek is tributary to the San Joaquin River.

History
Arroyo de San Luis Gonzaga was a watering place on El Camino Viejo in the San Joaquin Valley between Arroyo de Romero and Arroyo de Los Baños. The creek was named for Saint Aloysius Gonzaga, an Italian saint of the sixteenth century.

The adobe of the rancho Rancho San Luis Gonzaga was located along the creek in a site now behind the dam, under the waters, of the San Luis Reservoir.

Watershed
San Luis Creek initially flows north where it receives flows from Spicer Creek then turns eastwards towards San Luis Reservoir. Before reaching the reservoir it receives flows from Pacheco State Park's Salt Creek (and Salt Creek's Hidden Creek subtributary) from the left. Just before reaching the reservoir, San Luis Creek receives Portuguese Creek from the right. In San Luis Reservoir it receives Cottonwood Creek in the Cottonwood Creek Wildlife Area from the left (north). Cottonwood Creek's historic mouth is now submerged in the reservoir to form Cottonwood Bay.

See also
List of rivers of California
O'Neill Forebay

References

Rivers of Merced County, California
El Camino Viejo
Rivers of Northern California
Central Valley Project